Steny may refer to:

Steny Hoyer
Tiské stěny, Czech name for Tyssaer Wände